Jakkuva is a village in Mentada tehsil of Vizianagaram District of India. It is also a gram panchayat.

References

Villages in Vizianagaram district